Lampanyctus acanthurus is a species of lanternfish.

References

External links

Lampanyctus
Fish described in 1974